Ralph "Cooney" Weiland (November 5, 1904 – July 3, 1985) was a Canadian ice hockey forward who played for the Boston Bruins, Ottawa Senators, and Detroit Red Wings of the National Hockey League (NHL). Weiland was part of the Bruins' 1928 "Dynamite Line" with Dutch Gainor and Dit Clapper, one of the earliest "named" forward lines in NHL history. He was born in Egmondville, Ontario, but grew up in Seaforth, Ontario.

Career

Player
Weiland began playing junior hockey in Seaforth, where he spent three seasons with his hometown team. In 1923 he moved to Owen Sound, Ontario to attend school, planning a career as a druggist. He joined that city's junior team, the Owen Sound Greys, and led them to the 1924 Memorial Cup as Canadian champions. He was the club's top scorer with 68 goals in 25 games.

After the Greys lost the 1925 OHA final to Toronto Aura Lee, Weiland began a three-year stint with the Minneapolis Millers of the old American Hockey Association. That led to the start of his NHL career with Boston, where he celebrated his rookie campaign in 1928–29 with a Stanley Cup victory over the New York Rangers. It was the first Cup win in Bruins history.

In his second season during 1929–30, he scored 43 goals and 73 points in 44 games. That year, the NHL allowed forward passing for the first time, but it did not create its offsides rule until December 1929. Weiland flourished under those conditions, shattering the NHL's single-season points record of 51 which had been set two years earlier by Montreal Canadiens legend Howie Morenz. Weiland held the record alone until 1942–43, when Doug Bentley of the Chicago Black Hawks tied it, and shared it for one more year—Boston's Herb Cain broke the record with 82 points in 1943–44.

Weiland scored four goals in Boston's 7–0 victory over the Pittsburgh Pirates on February 25, 1930, becoming the third Bruin to achieve the feat.

The Bruins went to the Cup final again in 1930 but were swept by Montreal. Weiland had a brief career with Ottawa and played two seasons in Detroit, reaching the Cup final for a third time in 1934. One of his fellow Red Wings that year was Teddy Graham, an old teammate from the 1924 Greys. Weiland returned to Boston in 1935 and retired in 1939 with 173 goals and 333 points in 510 career games. But he ended his NHL playing career as he had begun it; the Bruins defeated the Toronto Maple Leafs and earned their second Stanley Cup.

Coach
He then stepped behind the bench as the club's new head coach and piloted Boston to its third Cup in 1940–41. Weiland helmed the Hershey Bears of the American Hockey League for the next four seasons, then coached the league's New Haven entry for two more years. In 1950 he began his longest coaching stint, at Harvard University, where he compiled a record of 315-173-17 before retiring in 1971. That year also marked his induction into the Hockey Hall of Fame.

A member of the Beanpot Hall of Fame, Weiland was twice named coach of the year by the American Hockey Coaches Association, first in 1955, when he led the Crimson to third place in the NCAA tournament, and again in his final season, when his team captured the ECAC tournament. The New England Hockey Writers Association named Weiland its coach of the year five times and honored him with the Schaefer Pen Award for contribution to amateur hockey in 1962. He received the Lester Patrick Award for contribution to hockey in the United States in 1972.

Weiland coached seven All-Americans, including three-time first-team selection Joe Cavanagh '71 and two-time pick David Johnston '63. His players earned a total of 26 first team All-Ivy honors, highlighted by the 1956–57 team, which was made up entirely of Crimson players.

Four of Weiland's Harvard players helped the 1960 U.S. Olympic team win the gold medal in Squaw Valley. Among that group was the legendary Bill Cleary '56, who went on to assist Weiland and succeed him as head coach. Cleary served in that role for 19 seasons and as athletic director for 11. He earned the Hobey Baker Legend of College Hockey Award in 1993.

Cufflinks presented to Weiland after Owen Sound's Memorial Cup win in 1924 are part of a permanent junior hockey exhibit at the Hockey Hall of Fame in Toronto.

Career statistics

* Stanley Cup Champion.

Head coaching record

NHL

College

References

External links

1904 births
1985 deaths
Boston Bruins captains
Boston Bruins coaches
Boston Bruins players
Canadian ice hockey centres
Canadian ice hockey coaches
Detroit Red Wings players
Harvard Crimson men's ice hockey coaches
Hershey Bears coaches
Hockey Hall of Fame inductees
Ice hockey people from Ontario
Lester Patrick Trophy recipients
National Hockey League scoring leaders (prior to 1947–48)
Ottawa Senators (1917) players
Owen Sound Greys players
People from Huron County, Ontario
Stanley Cup champions
Stanley Cup championship-winning head coaches